The Thomas Ebright Memorial Award is presented annually for outstanding career contributions to the American Hockey League. The award is named for Thomas Ebright, the former owner of the Portland Pirates and Baltimore Skipjacks. Ebright was a longtime member of the Board of Governors until his death in 1997.

Winners

References

External links
Official AHL website
AHL Hall of Fame

American Hockey League trophies and awards